Cerro Cora is a 1978 Paraguayan war film set during the last days of the Paraguayan War.

Cast
 Roberto De Felice as Francisco Solano López
 Rosa Ros as Eliza Lynch
 Nicasio Altamirano Valiente as Vice-Presidente Sanchez
 José Alfredo Pellón as Juan Crisóstomo Centurión 
 Fátima Coroenl as Rosita Carrera
 Victorino Baez Irala as Gral. José Eduvigis Díaz

See also
 Battle of Acosta Ñu
 Battle of Cerro Cora

External links
 
 Cerro Cora at YouTube

1978 films
Paraguayan war films
Films based on actual events
1970s Spanish-language films
Guaraní-language films
Paraguay in fiction
1978 multilingual films